Othala, also known as ēðel and odal, is a rune that represents the o and œ phonemes in the Elder Futhark and the Anglo-Saxon Futhorc writing systems respectively. Its name is derived from the reconstructed Proto-Germanic *ōþala- "heritage; inheritance, inherited estate". As it does not occur in Younger Futhark, it disappears from the Scandinavian record around the 8th century, however its usage continued in England into the 11th century. 

As with other symbols used historically in Europe such as the swastika and Celtic cross, othala has been appropriated by far-right groups such as the Nazi party and neo-Nazis. The rune also continues to be used in non-racist contexts, both in Heathenry and in wider popular culture such as the works of J.R.R. Tolkien.

Name and etymology

The term "odal" refers to Scandinavian laws of inheritance which established land rights for families that had owned that a parcel of land over a number of generations, restricting its sale to others. Among other aspects, this protected the inheritance rights of daughters against males from outside the immediate family. Some of these laws remain in effect today in Norwway as the Odelsrett (allodial right). The tradition of Udal law found in Shetland, Orkney, and the Isle of Man, is from the same origin.

Elder Futhark o-rune

The o-rune is attested early, in inscriptions from the 3rd century, such as the Thorsberg chape (DR7)  and the Vimose planer (Vimose-Høvelen, DR 206).

Wolfgang Krause (1964) has speculated that the o rune is used as an ideograph denoting possession in the Thorsberg chape inscription.  The inscription has owlþuþewaz, read by Krause as O[þila] - W[u]lþu-þewaz "inherited property - the servant of Wulþuz".

The othala rune is found in some transitional inscriptions of the 6th or 7th century, such as the Gummarp, Björketorp and Stentoften runestones, but it disappears from the Scandinavian record by the 8th century. The Old Norse o phoneme is now written in Younger Futhark with the same letter as the u phoneme, the Ur rune.

Anglo-Saxon œ-rune

The Anglo-Saxon runes preserve the full set of 24 Elder Futhark runes (besides introducing innovations), but in some cases these runes are given new sound values due to Anglo-Frisian sound changes.  The othala rune is such a case: the o sound in the Anglo-Saxon system is now expressed by ōs ᚩ, a derivation of the old Ansuz rune; the othala rune is known in Old English as ēðel (with umlaut due to the form ōþila-) and is used to express an œ sound, but is attested only rarely in epigraphy (outside of simply appearing in a futhark row). Epigraphical attestations include:
the Frisian Westeremden yew-stick, possibly as part of a given name Ƿimod (Ƿimœd)
the Harford (Norfolk) brooch, dated c. 650, in a finite verb form: luda:gibœtæsigilæ "Luda repaired the brooch"
the left panel of the Franks Casket, twice:  tƿœgen gibroþær afœddæ hiæ ƿylif "two brothers (scil. Romulus and Remus), a she-wolf nourished them".

The Anglo-Saxon rune poem preserves the meaning "an inherited estate" for the rune name:

In some manuscripts and runic inscriptions, such as the Seax of Beagnoth, othala is written with a single vertical line instead of the two diagonal legs, which has been proposed as a simplified form of the rune.

Modern use

Far-right iconography

Open usage
[[File:Flag of Volksdeutsche in Croatia.svg|thumb|200px|Flag of the Croatian .]]
The symbol derived from othala with wings or feet (serifs) was the badge of the SS Race and Settlement Main Office, which was responsible for maintaining the racial purity of the Nazi Schutzstaffel (SS). It was also the emblem of ethnic Germans of the 7th SS Volunteer Mountain Division Prinz Eugen operating during World War II in the Nazi Germany-sponsored Independent State of Croatia.  

The rune was further used, along with other traditional symbols from European cultures such as a Tiwaz rune and a Celtic cross, and slogans associated with Nazism and far-right extremism by the Christchurch mosque shooter Brenton Harrison Tarrant.

Heathen Front was a Neo-Nazi group, active during the 1990s to 2005, that espoused a racist form of Heathenry. It described its ideas as odalism'' in reference to the alternative name for othala.

Inadvertent likeness
In April 2014, the British Topman clothing company apologised after using the othala rune in one of their clothing lines, due to its usage by far-right groups.

At the Conservative Political Action Conference (CPAC) held in Orlando, Florida, on February 25–28, 2021, the floor layout of the main stage resembled the winged othala rune, leading to speculation on social media as to why that design was chosen. CPAC chairman Matt Schlapp said comparisons were "outrageous and slanderous".  Design firm Design Foundry later took responsibility for the design of the stage, saying that it "intended to provide the best use of space, given the constraints of the ballroom and social distancing requirements."  Ian Walters, director of communications for the ACU and CPAC, said they would stop using Design Foundry.

Heathenry

Othala, along with other runes more widely, often feature prominently in the practices of Heathens, and are commonly used to decorate items and in tattoos.

The use of runes such as othala by far-right groups has been strongly condemned by some Heathen groups, including Asatru UK which released a public statement that "[it] is categorically opposed to fascist movements, or any movements, using the symbols of our faith for hate".

Popular culture
As with other historical runes, othala is used by J.R.R. Tolkien in The Hobbit as seen on Thror's map of Erebor, and as a base for the dwarvish Cirth writing systems used in The Lord of the Rings and described in Tolkien's Legendarium. Othala is also used as the symbol for the "Lore" resource in Northgard, released in 2018.

The Anti-Defamation League notes that due to it being part of the runic alphabet, the othala rune is used widely in a non-racist manner and that it should be interpreted in conjunction with its context.

See also
 Troll cross - A symbol which resembles the rune

References

External links
 

Fascist symbols
Heraldic charges
Nazi symbolism
Runes
Symbols